The Forest Lake Ward is a Brisbane City Council ward covering Doolandella, Inala, Richlands, and parts of Forest Lake and Durack.

Councillors for Forest Lake Ward

Results

References 

City of Brisbane wards